Anan Ameri (born 1944) is an Arab American museum director.

Biography

Anan Ameri was born in 1944 and grew up in Damascus and Amman. In 1951, when she was six her family permanently left their home in Jerusalem and settled in Jordan. Her mother ran a print shop in Amman while her father was Jordan’s foreign minister and the ambassador to Egypt. Ameri got a bachelor of Arts in sociology from the University of Jordan. She then attended Cairo University where she graduated with a master's degree before moving to the US and completing her sociology PhD in Wayne State University in 1974. Ameri also spent a year on a fellowship at Harvard. Ameri became politically active while at school attending her first rally aged about 11. She worked with both the Palestine Research Center in Beirut, and founded the Palestinian Aid Society of America of which she was the director from 1980 to 1993.

Ameri moved to Detroit for her first husband. Then in 1989 she moved to Washington D.C. Her second husband enticed her back to Detroit with a position as director of the cultural arts program in ACCESS (Arab Community Center for Economic and Social Services). As result of that work lead to the creation of Dearborn’s Arab American National Museum. Ameri has been the museum director and went on to write. She has won a Palestine Book Award. Ameri was named the 2005 Michiganian of the Year by The Detroit News. Since then she has also been named the ACCESS 2020 Arab American of the Year.

Bibliography
 The Scent of Jasmine, May 2017
 Arab American Encyclopedia 2000, editor
The Wandering Palestinian, Nov 2020

Sources

1944 births
Living people
American writers of Arab descent
University of Jordan alumni
Cairo University alumni
Wayne State University alumni